The Marginal Service (stylized in all caps) is an upcoming original Japanese anime television series animated by studio 3Hz and produced by Cygames. It is directed by Masayuki Sakoi and written by Kenta Ihara, with Yoshio Kosakai designing the characters, and Yūsuke Seo composing the music. It is scheduled to premiere on April 12, 2023, on NTV and other networks. The opening theme song is "Quiet explosion" by Mamoru Miyano, while the ending theme song is "Salt & Sugar" by Yuma Uchida.

Characters

References

External links
 Anime official website 
 

2023 anime television series debuts
3Hz
Anime with original screenplays
Cygames franchises
Upcoming anime television series